
Composition H6 is a castable military explosive mixture composed of the following percentages by weight: 
 44.0% RDX 
 29.5% TNT
 21.0% powdered aluminium
 5.0% paraffin wax as a phlegmatizing agent.
 0.5% calcium chloride

H6 is used in a number of military applications, notably underwater munitions (e.g. naval mines, depth charges and torpedoes) where it has generally replaced torpex, being less shock-sensitive and having more stable storage characteristics. It is approximately 1.35 times more powerful than pure TNT.

Properties
 Density: 1.72 g/cm3
 Velocity of detonation: 7,367 m/s

See also
Torpex
Tritonal
Minol
Amatol
Composition C

References 

Explosives